The Roman Catholic Diocese of Constantine (-Hippone) is a Roman Catholic diocese in the ecclesiastical province of Algiers in Algeria.

History
25 July 1866: Established as Diocese of Constantine from the Diocese of Algiers.
23 September 1867: Name Changed to Diocese of Constantine (-Hippone)

Special churches
The former cathedral of the diocese is the Cathédrale Notre-Dame des Sept-Douleurs in Constantine. The building is now considered secular.
The current pro-cathedral is the minor basilica Basilique Saint Augustin in Annaba (Hippo).

Ordinaries

Bishops of Constantine 
Félix-Joseph-François-Barthélemy de Las Cases ( – )
 Joseph-Jean-Louis Robert ( – ), appointed Bishop of Marseille, France
 Prosper Auguste Dusserre ( – )
 François-Charles-Marie Gillard ( - ), died without being consecrated
 Barthélemy Clément Combes ( – ), appointed Archbishop of Carthage
 Ludovic-Henri-Marie-Ixile Julien-Laferrière ( – )
 Jules-Etienne Gazaniol ( – )
 Jules-Alexandre-Léon Bouissière ( – )
 Amiel-François Bessière ( – )
 Emile-Jean-François Thiénard ( – )
 Léon-Étienne Duval ( – ), appointed Archbishop of Algiers (Cardinal in 1965)
 Paul Pierre Pinier ( – )
 Jean Baptiste Joseph Scotto ( – )
 Gabriel Piroird, IdP ( – )
 Paul Jacques Marie Desfarges, S.J. ( - ), appointed Archbishop of Algiers
 Nicolas Lhernould (9 December 2019–present)

Sources
GCatholic.org
 catholic-hierarchy.org

External links

Constantine
Constantine
Constantine
Constantine, Roman Catholic Diocese of
1866 establishments in Algeria